Christoph Riegler (born 30 March 1992) is an Austrian professional footballer.

Club career
Riegler joined the youth set-up of SKN St. Pölten from SK Rapid Wien in March 2007, and he advanced quickly through the club's youth system, making his debut in the Austrian Football First League as a stand in for injured first-choice goalkeeper Thomas Vollnhofer in a 1–0 win against SC Austria Lustenau on 15 October 2010. Riegler's performances were such that he remained in the first team after Vollnhofer returned from injury. From 30 March 2011, Riegler dropped down to the bench so that he could focus on his schoolwork. After missing the start of the following season due to international commitments, Riegler re-established himself as his team's first-choice goalkeeper on his return.

On 23 December 2021, it was announced that Riegler would join SC Rheindorf Altach on a six-month contract, after having played more than 10 seasons and 300 league games for SKN St. Pölten.

International career
Riegler has represented the Austria under-21s on eight occasions, and he was an unused member of the Austrian squad at the 2011 FIFA Under-20 World Cup.

Honours
SKN St. Pölten
 2. Liga: 2015–16

References

1992 births
Living people
People from Melk District
Association football goalkeepers
Austrian footballers
SKN St. Pölten players
SC Rheindorf Altach players
Austria under-21 international footballers
Footballers from Lower Austria
Austrian Football Bundesliga players
2. Liga (Austria) players